Princess Sukseon (Hangul: 숙선옹주, Hanja: 淑善翁主; 11 April 1793 – 7 June 1836) was the daughter of King Jeongjo of Joseon and Royal Noble Consort Su of the Bannam Park clan, and the only surviving sibling of Sunjo of Joseon.

Biography

Early life 
Princess Sukseon was born on 11 April 1793 as the second child and only daughter of Royal Noble Consort Su and King Jeongjo. Her personal name is unknown. 

Her father later died on 18 August 1800, during his 24th year of reign. Thus having her older brother, Yi Gong, ascend the throne on 23 August 1800.

Marriage and later life 
On 27 May 1804, at age 11, Princess Sukseon married Hong Hyeon-ju, the youngest son of Hong In-mo and Lady Seo of the Dalseong Seo clan. Her husband was honoured as Prince Consort Yeongmyeong (영명위). The marriage ceremony was held in Changdeok Palace’s Huijeongdang Hall.

The Princess had a good relationship with her brother, Sunjo. As a result, he continued to visit her after her marriage, despite the disapproval of the court officials.

In 1813, she gave birth to her only child, a son named Hong Woo-cheol.  

Based on Hong Seon-pyo's book, Joseon Culinary Studies (조선요리학, 朝鮮料理學), the Princess made a new dish from diced radish. When it was tasted by the Royal Family, they all liked it and the King highly praised her. The dish was later named Kkakdugi (깍두기), because cutting food into cubes is called kkakduk sseolgi (깍둑썰기) in Korean.

Princess Sukseon died on June 7, 1836.

Family 
 Father: Yi San, King Jeongjo of Joseon (이산 조선 정조) (28 October 1752 –  18 August 1800)
 Grandfather: Crown Prince Sado (사도세자) (13 February 1735 – 12 July 1762)
 Grandmother: Lady Hyegyeong of the Pungsan Hong clan (혜경궁 홍씨) (6 August 1735 – 13 January 1816)
 Mother: Royal Noble Consort Su of the Bannam Park clan (수빈 박씨) (1 June 1770 – 6 February 1823)
 Grandfather: Park Jun-won (박준원, 朴準源) (1739 – 1807)
Grandmother: Lady Won of the Wonju Won clan (정경부인 원주 원씨) (1740 – 1783)
Sibling(s)
 Older brother: King Sunjo of Joseon (조선 순조) (29 July 1790 – 13 December 1834)
 Sister-in-law: Queen Sunwon of the Andong Kim clan (순원왕후 안동 김씨) (8 June 1789 – 21 September 1857)
 Nephew: Crown Prince Hyomyeong (효명세자) (18 September 1809 – 25 June 1830)
 Niece-in-law: Queen Sinjeong of the Pungyang Jo clan (신정왕후 풍양 조씨) (21 January 1809 – 4 June 1890)
 Niece: Princess Myeongon (명온공주) (1810 – 1832)
 Nephew-in-law: Kim Hyeon-geun (김현근, 金賢根) (1810 – 1868)
 Niece: Princess Bokon (복온공주) (1818 – 1828)
 Nephew-in-law: Kim Byeon-ju (김병주, 金炳疇) (1819 – 1853)
 Unnamed nephew (1820 – 1820)
 Niece: Princess Deokon (덕온공주) (1828 – 1844)
 Nephew-in-law: Yun Ui-seon (윤의선, 尹宜善) (? – 1887)
 Adoptive nephew: King Cheoljong of Joseon (조선 철종) (25 July 1831 – 16 January 1864)
 Adoptive niece-in-law: Queen Cheorin of the Andong Kim clan (철인왕후 안동 김씨) (27 April 1837 – 12 June 1878)
Husband
 Hong Hyeon-ju (홍현주, 洪顯周) (1793 – 1865)
 Father-in-law: Hong In-mo (홍인모, 洪仁謨) (1755 – 1812)
 Mother-in-law: Yeongsuhap, Lady Seo of the Dalseong Seo clan (영수합 달성 서씨, 令壽閤 達城 徐氏) (1753 – 1823)
 Brother-in-law: Hong Seok-ju (홍석주, 洪奭周) (1774 – 1842)
 Sister-in-law: Hong Won-ju (홍원주, 洪原周), Yuhandang (유한당) (1783 - ?)
 Brother-in-law: Hong Gil-ju (홍길주, 洪吉周) (1786 – 1841)
Issue
 Son: Hong Woo-cheol (홍우철, 洪祐喆) (1813 – 1853)
 Daughter-in-law: Lady Yi of the Jeonju Yi clan (전주 이씨, 全州 李氏) (1815 - 1868)
 Grandson: Hong Seung-gan (홍승간, 洪承幹) (1834 – 1845)
 Grandson: Hong Seung-eok (홍승억, 洪承億) (1842 – 1882)

References

1793 births
1836 deaths

Princesses of Joseon
House of Yi
19th-century Korean people